The Northwest Atlantic Fisheries Centre is a Government of Canada research facility and office complex located in St. John's, Newfoundland and Labrador.

It is primarily used by the Department of Fisheries and Oceans.

External links
  Northwest Atlantic Fisheries Centre (NAFC)
 The DFO: watchdog of our waters

Buildings and structures in St. John's, Newfoundland and Labrador
Canadian federal government buildings
Research institutes in Canada
Oceanographic organizations
Biological research institutes
Fisheries and Oceans Canada
Fisheries and aquaculture research institutes